Battle of Fallujah may refer to:

 First Battle of Fallujah, April 2004 operation by US forces against Iraqi guerillas 
 Second Battle of Fallujah, joint American, Iraqi government, and British offensive in November and December 2004
 Fall of Fallujah, winter 2013–14 offensive of the Islamic State of Iraq and the Levant (ISIL) against the Iraqi government
 Siege of Fallujah (2016), February to May 2016 offensive of the Iraqi government against ISIL
 Third Battle of Fallujah, offensive by the Iraqi government against ISIL in May and June 2016

See also
 Fallujah during the Iraq War (2003)
 War in Iraq (2013–2017), war between Iraq and ISIL
 Gulf War (1990–91)